Our Lady of Sorrows of Turumba (Spanish: Nuestra Señora de los Dolores de Turumba; Tagalog: Mahal na Ina ng Hapis ng Turumba) is a Roman Catholic dolorous painted image of the Blessed Virgin Mary as Our Lady of Sorrows, enshrined in Pakil, Laguna, Philippines.

Etymology
The word turumba is alleged to be from the Tagalog phrase “Natumbá sa lakí ng tuwâ” (English: "Had trembled in great joy"). The first turumba in the icon's honour was held on September 14, 1788.

Description

The icon of Our Lady is a  oil painting on canvas. The face of Mary is contorted by pain from the dagger plunged into her heart, which Simeon has prophesied.

The icon is presently enshrined at the St. Peter of Alcantara Parish Church in Pakil. The second image of the Virgin Mary as Our Lady of Sorrows is an in-the-round replica of the image of Nuestra Señora de las Angustias from Spain.

History
The image, according to tradition, belonged to some missionaries who crossed Laguna de Bay in a launch. When the launch was shipwrecked, some of its relics were washed ashore including the icon of the Virgin.

One Friday morning, some fishermen found the icon in their nets. Believing it to be a religious image, they decided to bring it to a parish church. When the men carried the small painting, they found it too heavy. They tried sailing in directions with three icon until they brought it to the shore near Pakil Church. When they headed that way, the wind and current aided their course. Upon landing, they left the heavy image on a rock so they could continue their fishing duties.

A group of women found the icon the following Sunday morning. Although it had rained during the night, the canvas was miraculously dry. When they tried to take the icon away, they could not move it; even the strongest among them, Mariangga, could not lift it. They quickly told the parish priest, who in turn called the sacristans, choristers, and churchgoers at Mass to fetch the image. As they lifted the icon, it gave way. The townsfolk around began to sing and dance, giving birth to the turumba.

The Nuestra Señora de las Angustias image was episcopally crowned by the Bishop of Lipa,  Alejandro Olalia y Ayson on 23–24 May 1953.

Lupi Festival

The Seven days of Sorrows are known to the Philippines as Lupi fiestas:
 1st Lupi or ‘’Biernes Dolores’’ falls on the Friday preceding Palm Sunday.
 2nd Lupi or ‘’Pistang Martes’’ falls on Easter Tuesday.
 3rd Lupi or ‘’Pistang Biyatiko’’ falls on the 2nd Wednesday after Easter Sunday.
 4th Lupi or ‘’Pistang Biyernes’’ falls on the 3rd Friday after Easter Sunday.
 5th Lupi or ‘’Pistang Linggo’’ falls on the 4th Sunday after Easter Sunday.
 6th Lupi after the Feast of the Ascension falls on the 5th Sunday after Easter.
 7th Lupi falls on Pentecost.

The image is also brought out in procession on October 19, the town fiesta of Pakil. On the Sunday nearest September 15, the Catholic Church in the Philippines celebrates the feast of the discovery of the image.

Homage to the Virgin of Sorrows is done by the way of song and dance, drumbeat and shill cries of its devotees that the people regard as co-sharing with Mary's grief during the Passion of Christ. The turumba episodes are called lupi (meaning to fold) it is so because at the closing of every festivities, the novena booklet is folded to mark the pause in preparation for the next Lupi.

Old dresses of the Virgin are customarily shredded and given to pilgrims as tokens. It was said that when the piece of cloth from the Virgin is kept close to a person, it grants miraculous powers and protects against personal injury, accidents, fire, and calamities.

The statue is enshrined at the retablo in the main altar, The image is usually dressed in violet as a sign of sorrow for Jesus’ Passion (the color of Lent). The original icon found in the waters is enshrined in a separate retablo around bas reliefs of her Seven Sorrows in a chapel inside the church. St Peter of Alcantara Parish is located in Pakil, Laguna; over facing Laguna de Bay

Pontifical coronation

Pope Francis granted a decree of pontifical coronation specifically for the painted framed image on 24 May 2021. The image is scheduled to be crowned on 15 September 2023.

References

Barcelona, Mary Anne. Ynang Maria: A Celebration of the Blessed Virgin Mary in the Philippines. Edited by Consuelo B. Estepa, P.D. Pasig: Anvil Publishing, Inc., 2004.
Roman Catholic Diocese of San Pablo: Diocesan Shrine of Nuestra Señora de los Dolores de Turumba

Turumba, Our Lady Of Sorrows Of
Turumba
Catholic Church in the Philippines
Religion in Laguna (province)
Paintings of the Virgin Mary
Our Lady of Sorrows